Louise McDaniel (born 24 May 2000) is a Northern Irish association footballer who plays as a midfielder for the Northern Ireland women's national team.

Club career
McDaniel has played for Linfield FC in Northern Ireland and for Blackburn Rovers FC in England.
Louise currently plays for North Belfast side Cliftonville Ladies and is part of the full-time Northern Ireland Women's squad preparing for the European Championships in England.

International career
McDaniel made her senior debut for Northern Ireland on 23 February 2021.

References

2000 births
Living people
Women's association footballers from Northern Ireland
Women's association football midfielders
Linfield Ladies F.C. players
Blackburn Rovers L.F.C. players
Women's Championship (England) players
Northern Ireland women's international footballers
Expatriate association footballers from Northern Ireland
Expatriate women's footballers in England
UEFA Women's Euro 2022 players